Florin Hidișan (24 June 1982 – 11 September 2022) was a Romanian footballer who played as a midfielder. He spent his entire career playing in Romania, having a total of 107 Liga I appearances with 7 goals scored and 110 Liga II appearances with 8 goals scored.

Hidișan died from stomach cancer in Cluj-Napoca, on 11 September, at the age of 40.

References

External links

1982 births
2022 deaths
Deaths from stomach cancer
Deaths from cancer in Romania
Sportspeople from Râmnicu Vâlcea
Romanian footballers
Association football midfielders
Liga I players
Liga II players
CSM Câmpia Turzii players
FC Internațional Curtea de Argeș players
FC Argeș Pitești players
CS Otopeni players
FC Brașov (1936) players
FC UTA Arad players
CS Pandurii Târgu Jiu players
FC Universitatea Cluj players
ACS Sticla Arieșul Turda players